Noushera is town and union council of Kachhi District in the Balochistan province of Pakistan.

References

Populated places in Kachhi District
Union councils of Balochistan, Pakistan